Melanolophia canadaria, the Canadian melanolophia, is a moth of the family Geometridae. The species was first described by Achille Guenée in 1857. It is found in North America from Florida to Nova Scotia, west to Saskatchewan and south to Texas.

The wingspan is 30–36 mm. Adults have dark brown or brown mottled wings. They are on wing from March to September in two generations per year.

The larvae feed on the leaves of Betula, Ulmus, Acer, Quercus, Pinus and Prunus species.

Subspecies
Melanolophia canadaria crama Rindge, 1964
Melanolophia canadaria choctawae Rindge, 1964

References

Moths described in 1857
Melanolophiini